The Pakistan Nuclear Regulatory Authorityپاکستان نیوکلیئر ریگولیٹری اتھارٹى; (PNRA), is mandated by the Government of Pakistan to regulate the use of nuclear energy, radioactive sources and ionizing radiation. The mission of PNRA is to protect the public, radiation workers and environment from the harmful effects of ionizing radiation by formulating and implementing effective regulations, building a relationship of trust with licensees, and maintaining transparency in its actions and decisions.

The concept of nuclear regulation existed in 1965 but it only gained full government commission in 2001, with the establishment of the Nuclear Command Authority. The agency was established in 2001 after the President of Pakistan Justice (retired) Rafiq Tarar signed the executive decree, 'Pakistan Nuclear Regulatory Authority Ordinance No.III' in 2000. PNRA opened its operations in 2001 and is headquartered in Islamabad.

History
The nuclear regulatory infrastructure has been in place since 1965, when the Pakistan Research Reactor was commissioned. Established by Pakistani scientists, the regulatory regime was significantly improved when, in 1971, the Karachi Nuclear Power Plant was commissioned. Since then, the Pakistan Atomic Energy Commission (PAEC) established the nuclear safety and licensing division at PAEC Headquarters as the de facto regulatory body. The Nuclear Regulatory Authority was upgraded to 'Directorate of Nuclear Safety and Radiation Protection' (DNSRP) after the promulgation of the Pakistan Nuclear Safety and Radiation Protection Ordinance 1984 by Presidential Order.

In 1994, Pakistan signed the international Convention on Nuclear Safety. As part of the convention, the Directorate of Nuclear Safety and Radiation Protection became part of the Government of Pakistan's federal agencies. It was to establish an independent nuclear regulatory body entrusted with the implementation of the legislative and regulatory framework governing nuclear power in Pakistan, radiation use in the country, and to separate regulatory functions from the promotional aspects of Pakistan's nuclear programme.

In 1995, (immediately after signing the Nuclear Convention) the Pakistan Atomic Energy Commission (PAEC) had established the Pakistan Nuclear Regulatory Board (PNRB) within itself. PNRB was established to oversee regulatory affairs. Complete separation of promotion and regulatory functions and responsibilities was achieved in 2001, when the President of Pakistan promulgated the Pakistan Nuclear Regulatory Authority Ordinance No.III of 2001. Consequently, the Pakistan Nuclear Regulatory Authority (PNRA) was created, dissolving PNRB, and the Directorate of Nuclear Safety and Radiation Protection. The first chairman of PNRA was Jamshed Azim Hashmi who headed the authority till 2009. In 2009, the chairmanship was transferred to Anwar Habib. In 2017, Zaheer Ayub Baig took charge as chairman. In 2021,  Faizan Mansoor took charge as chairman.

International cooperation
The PNRA's Directorate of International Cooperation (ICD) is responsible for arranging international training and international cooperation. The ICD facilitates completion of all formalities regarding training or visits (official), abroad of PNRA officials. The ICD takes care of passport and visa issues for PNRA officials, clearances from the government departments, departure formalities, and liaison with the International Atomic Energy Agency (IAEA) for departure formalities.

ICD also liaises with other governmental departments regarding visits of experts coming to PNRA from the IAEA and, through bilateral agreements, from other regulatory bodies. It coordinates with Pakistani Embassies abroad for visas, concerned government departments for security matters, PAEC and IAEA.

Chairman
PNRA is headed by the Chairman since its inception in 2001. Following is the list of PNRA chairmen and their respective tenures.

Full Time Members

Secretaries of PNRA

Nuclear Facilities under Pakistan Nuclear Regulatory Authority

See also 
 Pakistan Nuclear Society

References

External links

Nuclear technology in Pakistan
Nuclear power in Pakistan
Regulatory authorities of Pakistan
Nuclear regulatory organizations
2001 establishments in Pakistan
Government agencies established in 2001